The Affordable College Textbook Act is a United States legislative bill intended to support use of open textbooks. It was introduced on April 4, 2019, to the 116th Congress by four senators (Dick Durbin of Illinois, Angus King of Maine, Kyrsten Sinema of Arizona, Tina Smith of Minnesota), and one representative (Joe Neguse of Colorado). Organizations supporting the bill include the American Federation of Teachers, the American Association of Community Colleges, the Association of Research Libraries, and Creative Commons.

History

Previously, the bill was introduced to the 115th Congress on September 26, 2017. If passed, the program would have tried to make education less expensive for college students. The U.S. Department of Education would have coordinated funding. U.S. Senators Dick Durbin of Illinois, Al Franken of Minnesota, and Angus King of Maine sponsored S.1864, and U.S. Representatives Jared Polis of Colorado and Kyrsten Sinema of Arizona sponsored the identical H.R.3840. Later co-sponsors in the Senate included Democrats Richard Blumenthal of Connecticut, Benjamin Cardin of Maryland, Jack Reed of Rhode Island, and Tina Smith of Minnesota. Later co-sponsors in the House included a mixture of Republicans and Democrats: Carlos Curbelo of Florida, Peter DeFazio of Oregon, Peter King of New York, Mia Love of Utah, Tom MacArthur of New Jersey, and Rick Nolan of Minnesota.

Similar bills had been previously introduced in 2009, 2010, 2013, and 2015 as the "Open College Textbook Act" and the "Affordable College Textbook Act".

In 2018, Congress budgeted five million dollars for a related pilot program.

See also
 List of bills in the 116th United States Congress
 List of bills in the 115th United States Congress

References

Further reading

External links
 2019-2020 Senate Bill 1036 and House Resolution 2107 at Congress.gov.
 2017-2018 Senate Bill 1864 and House Resolution 3840 tracker at GovTrack

Proposed legislation of the 113th United States Congress
Proposed legislation of the 114th United States Congress
Proposed legislation of the 115th United States Congress
Proposed legislation of the 116th United States Congress
United States proposed federal education legislation
2017 in education
2019 in education
Higher education in the United States
Textbooks
Open educational resources
Universities and colleges in the United States
Education policy in the United States